The Cîteaux Moralia in Job is an illuminated copy of Gregory the Great's Moralia in Job made at the reform monastery of Cîteaux in Burgundy around 1111.  It is one of the most familiar but least understood illuminated manuscripts of the Middle Ages. The manuscript is housed at the municipal library in Dijon (Bibliothèque municipale de Dijon).

Close analysis of these illuminations reveals a gradual transformation from the conventional and textually unrelated images that were common at the time and that are found at the beginning of the manuscript (the famous frontispiece is an exception, having been added later) to largely unique and textually based ones further on.  This indicates a change in attitude toward the illuminated initial on the part of the artist only after production had begun, something that was not part of the original conception.  More specifically, after initially illuminating this patristic work in a conventional and unexceptional manner in the illuminations in the beginning of the book, the artist gradually began to internalize the exegetical principals laid out by Gregory in the Letter to Leander (that is part of the prefatory matter of the book), in particular, Gregory's demand that one "become" what one reads.  In the same way that Gregory found it acceptable to analyze a line or even a word of text out of context, according to modern sensibilities, so the artist was quite willing to do the same, often with reference to the contemporary monastic polemics of reform.  The end result was the exegetical spiritualization of the first generation Cistercian experience, the visual expression of Gregory's exegetical method.

An example of this may be found in the illuminated initial "I" to Book Twenty-one (Dijon, Bibliothèque municipale, ms 173:41).  The initial depicts a tattered monk with his knife in his belt and his leggings slipping down, chopping away at the base of a tree that is unusually large for a medieval manuscript and that forms the body of the initial.  Meanwhile, above, a layman is also busy cutting, but this time branch by branch.  One of the main themes of Book Twenty-one is the importance of the avoidance of temptation. According to Gregory, the senses of the body are the windows of the soul, and it is by thoughtlessly looking out through these windows that a person may fall into the pleasure of sin—especially lust—through desire, even though this was against the person's original intention and even though the person never actually acts upon that desire (Moralia 21:4-5).  It is for this reason that such danger should be anticipated and the source of such temptation—in this passage, primarily women—be avoided, even if this only involves the sense of sight and nothing more. As an example of the seriousness of the role of the sense of sight in the process of sin, Gregory points out that "Eve would not have touched the forbidden tree if she had not first thoughtlessly looked at it."  And so in the initial to this book, the ragged monk cuts the tree of temptation in accordance with the biblical injunction, "at the root" (Mat. 3:10, Lk. 3:9).  That is, he cuts himself off from the sight of all such temptations by fleeing the world and seeking shelter in monastic seclusion.  The layman, in conceptual antithesis to the monk, cuts the tree branch by branch while perched precariously in its midst, ignoring his impending doom as implied in the inevitable fall of the tree.  In other words, the pious lay person is contented with half measures by continuing to live "in the world" and will inevitably pay the price for that decision.

References

Bibliography
 Cîteaux manuscript summaries 168–170, 173 (in French)
 C. Oursel, Miniatures Cisterciennes (1109-1134), (Macon: 1960) pp. 11ff, pls. XXI-XXXIV

12th-century illuminated manuscripts
1111 in Europe
12th-century Christianity